The 1997 Canberra Raiders season was the 16th in the club's history. They competed in the Super League's Telstra Cup and World Club Championship. Coached by Mal Meninga and captained by Ricky Stuart, the Raiders finished third in the Telstra Cup regular season, and were eliminated in the Preliminary Final. The club did not make the finals of the World Club Championship, despite winning five of their six matches.

Telstra Cup

Finals

World Club Championship
Pool A

References

Canberra Raiders seasons
Canberra Raiders